Armin Meier (1943 – 31 May 1978) was a German actor, best known for his performances in films of Rainer Werner Fassbinder.

According to the documentary film Fassbinder: To Love Without Demands (2015), directed by Christian Braad Thomsen, Meier was one of Fassbinder's many lovers. Meier killed himself shortly after not being invited to Fassbinder's 33rd birthday party. Meier's body was later found in Fassbinder's apartment.

Filmography

References

External links

1943 births
1978 deaths
German male actors
1978 suicides
20th-century German LGBT people
German gay actors
Drug-related suicides in Germany